Vidiyum Varai Kaathiru is a 1981 Tamil-language crime thriller film, written and directed by K. Bhagyaraj. The movie is thematically similar to the 1971 movie A New Leaf. The movie received positive reviews during the release. The film was remade in Hindi as Pathar Ke Insan and in Malayalam as Sharam.

Plot 

Raja (Bhagyaraj) arrives at Ooty to get a job. He bumps into Rajasekhar, a wealthy businessman, and trespasses his property 3 times. One day, some goons kidnap Rajasekhar for a suitcase of money and Raja saves him by fighting them. Rajasekhar brings Raja to a diner and gives him a portion of the money in the suitcase. Raja refuses and requests for a job instead. Rajasekhar agrees and lets him stay in his house. In the night, Raja hears a woman screaming and is unnerved. The next morning, he begs Rajasekhar to let him leave. Rajasekhar introduces Raja to the screaming woman, his mentally ill daughter Sathya. He narrates a flashback about Sathya to Raja.

Sathya and her sister Kala were talented artists. Sathya was a singer and Kala was a Bharatanatyam dancer. Kala is very sensitive and during dinner, both of them argue about who is superior. The next day, the sisters enter a challenge where Kala must dance to Sathya's singing. Kala makes a misstep and falls, losing the challenge. Unable to tolerate the loss, Kala jumps off a cliff and dies by suicide. Guilty and mentally tormented about her sister's death, Sathya transforms into a mentally-ill patient. Hearing the story, Raja requests Rajasekhar for a job to take care of Sathya and cure her illness. Raja tries several hilarious methods to ‘cure’ Sathya's illness. Sathya still recovers slowly and is happier than before. But one night, Raja frames Sathya of trying to murder him by injuring himself. Rajasekhar brings Raja to a doctor, who is actually set up by Raja. The doctor nudges Rajasekhar to marry Sathya to a trustworthy groom, explaining sex is a method to cure her mental illness. Rajasekhar believes Raja is the best groom for Sathya and marries both of them.

Then one day, a visitor comes to Rajasekhar's house. He is the brother-in-law of Rajasekhar, Sethupathy. When Raja sees Sethupathy, he is startled. In the past, Raja cheated Sethupathy in a gambling match and it is revealed Raja is a hardened criminal. A woman in his group of small-time criminals loves him but he doesn't reciprocate her love. Sethupathy is informed of Raja's plot to murder Sathya and usurp Rajasekhar's property, which is under Sathya's name. Sethupathy demands half of the property when Raja kills Sathya. Raja is reluctant to agree. Raja tries to kill Sathya by pushing her off a cliff similar to the way Kala died so he can frame it as a suicide. But the next day Sathya returns alive, saved by some dwellers. The twist is, in the accident, Sathya's mental illness is cured too and she is transformed into a sane woman. Sethupathy is disappointed in Raja. Rajasekhar explains to Sathya about her marriage to Raja. Raja makes his second plan to kill Sathya. He takes her to a honeymoon, opens up the gas tanks so Sathya will die in the fire. But this plan fails when the servant enters the kitchen before Sathya. The police is informed of this and the inspector suspects Raja to be the culprit of the ‘fire accident’.

Raja then plots to kill Sathya by shooting her through the window from a long range. But this plan fails he mistakes the housemaid's shadow for Sathya's. The housemaid is killed and the police investigates the murder. The inspector deduces Raja is the culprit and explains it to Rajasekhar, who is hesitant to label his groom. Sathya believes Raja tried to murder her and transfers Rajasekhar's property to his name for the fear of death. She is pregnant too, so 2 lives are at stake. When she tells this to Raja, Raja feels he failed and leaves. Raja learns the truth about the woman who loves him teamed up with Sethupathy and double-crossed him to get all the property. Raja captures both Sethupathy and the woman, forcing one of them to die. But Sethupathy's selfishness results in the death of both. The inspector and the police surround the house to arrest Raja. Raja locks the inspector in his room and threatens to kill him. During the standoff, Raja accidentally shoots Sathya and the inspector requests him to surrender. Raja starts to feel true love for Sathya and embraces her.

Cast 
The main actors are listed below:
Bhagyaraj as Raja
Sathyakala as Satya
Karathe R. V. T. Mani
Gokulnath
Sangili Murugan

Soundtrack 
The music was composed by Ilaiyaraaja.

References

External links 
 

1980s Tamil-language films
1981 thriller films
1981 films
Films directed by K. Bhagyaraj
Films scored by Ilaiyaraaja
Indian thriller films
Tamil films remade in other languages